Loren Gray Beech (born April 19, 2002) is an American social media personality and singer best known for the TikTok career she began in 2016, at the age of 13. She is the seventeenth most-followed individual on TikTok as of December 2022, and was the most-followed TikTok individual from March 31, 2019 to March 25, 2020. She was signed to Virgin Records and Capitol Records until February 2021, when she became an independent artist.

Career

Social media
Loren Gray joined musical.ly (now known as TikTok) in 2015. After gaining a large following on musical.ly in the 8th grade, she began to get bullied at school. She eventually moved to Los Angeles, California and grew her other social media platforms. As of September 2022, she has more than 54.6 million TikTok followers, 23.4 million Instagram followers, 3.86 million YouTube subscribers, and over 1.5 million Twitter followers. On her backup Instagram, she has over 4.7 million followers. Gray is the seventeenth most-followed individual on TikTok and had been the most-followed TikTok individual from March 31, 2019 to March 25, 2020.

Music 
In 2017, Gray appeared in English pop singer HRVY’s music video for "Personal".

In March 2018, Gray signed a record deal with Virgin Records before releasing her debut single "My Story" in August, which she says is based on a friend who "kept falling in love with the wrong people". In November 2018, she released her second single, "Kick You Out", which was written and produced by herself and Ido Zmishlany, and was described by Billboard as showing "the true highs and lows that come from being in love". Her third single, "Queen", an empowering anthem produced by herself and Captain Cuts, was released in December 2018. The video for the song, released the following month, received more than 18 million views as of July 2021.

Gray was featured on Lost Kings' single "Anti-Everything", released on January 11, 2019. She cites Eminem and Justin Bieber among her favorite artists. On April 4, 2019, Loren Gray released two new singles – "Options" and "Lie Like That". She teamed up with Captain Cuts (Walk the Moon, Halsey, The Chainsmokers) to write and produce both tracks, bringing in collaborators Nija (Jason Derulo, Chris Brown) on "Options" and Australian artist Ivy Adara on "Lie Like That". On May 17, 2019, Loren Gray released a new single titled "Can't Do It" featuring American rapper Saweetie. It marks her first single as a lead artist to feature another artist. After taking almost a year break from releasing songs, she released a new single titled "Cake" on May 13, 2020. She released her final solo single with Virgin Records and Capitol Records titled “Alone” on July 21, 2020. She departed from her music label in February 2020 and became an independent artist. She released her first independent song with TELYKast on March 12, 2021. She released her first solo independent song titled “Piece of Work” on July 9, 2021. According to Billboard, she is one of the top 10 music influencers on TikTok, with over 50 million followers.

Brand 
On December 3, 2020, Gray launched her own jewelry brand, &always. Her Instagram run business has a follower count of 28.4K followers as of August 2022. She had been working on the brand a year prior to release. When first launched, the brand released two editions: The Starlet Mirror Edition and Otherworld Edition.

Wealth 
According to a Forbes report published in August 2020, Gray earned $2.4 million in 2019 from her numerous sponsorship deals and merchandise, making her the fourth highest-earning TikTok star.

Awards and nominations 
Gray was nominated for Choice Muser at the 2016 Teen Choice Awards and Muser of the Year at the 9th Annual Shorty Awards in 2017. In 2018, she was nominated for Choice Muser a second time at the 2018 Teen Choice Awards. She was nominated for the Social Star Award, a socially voted award, at the 2019 iHeart Radio Music Awards.

Filmography

Music videos

Web series

Discography

Singles

Collaborations

References

External links

 
 
 
 

2002 births
Living people
21st-century American women singers
21st-century American singers
American child singers
American TikTokers
American women pop singers
American YouTubers
Child pop musicians
Female models from Pennsylvania
People from Pottstown, Pennsylvania
Singers from Pennsylvania
Virgin Records artists